Kūkas Parish is an administrative unit of Jēkabpils Municipality in the Latgale region of Latvia.

Towns, villages and settlements of Kūkas parish 
Zīlāni

References 

Parishes of Latvia
Jēkabpils Municipality
Latgale